Andreas Seppi was the defending champion but decided not to participate this year.
Robin Haase won the title, defeating Filippo Volandri 6–2, 7–6(8) in the finals.

Seeds

Draw

Finals

Top half

Bottom half

References
 Main Draw
 Qualifying Draw

San Marino CEPU Open - Singles
San Marino CEPU Open